Asley González (born 5 September 1989 in Caibarién) is a Cuban judoka. He won the 2013 World Championship in the −90 kg event.  At the 2012 Summer Olympics, he won the silver medal in the Men's 90 kg competition.

Career

At the 2008 Olympics, González competed in the −90 kg category, and lost his first match to Yves-Matthieu Dafreville.  As Dafreville reached the semifinals, González was entered into the repechage, where he also lost his first match, to Roberto Meloni.

At the 2012 Olympics, he beat Héctor Campos, Dmitrij Gerasimenko and Mark Anthony, before beating Kirill Denisov in the semifinal.  In the final, González lost to Song Dae-Nam but won the silver medal.

At the 2016 Olympics, he beat Martín Michel and Quedjau Nhabali before losing to Lkhagvasürengiin Otgonbaatar.

References

External links
 
 
 
 
 

Judoka at the 2008 Summer Olympics
Judoka at the 2012 Summer Olympics
Judoka at the 2016 Summer Olympics
Olympic judoka of Cuba
Olympic silver medalists for Cuba
1989 births
Living people
Olympic medalists in judo
Medalists at the 2012 Summer Olympics
Cuban male judoka
World judo champions
Pan American Games silver medalists for Cuba
Pan American Games medalists in judo
Judoka at the 2015 Pan American Games
People from Caibarién
Medalists at the 2015 Pan American Games
20th-century Cuban people
21st-century Cuban people